Emmanuel Owuraku Amofah (born 8 February 1956; sometimes written as Amofa) is a Ghanaian politician and lawyer from Kibi who served as a member of the Parliament of Ghana for Abuakwa Central constituency from 1992 to 1996. He is a former deputy communication minister and deputy tourism minister. In 1992, he founded the Every Ghanaian Living Everywhere (EGLE) party. As a lawyer, he has worked in New York City as the CEO of Parking Ticket Busters, a ticket-broker business, as an attorney at Amofah Law Firm and as a one-time administrative law judge at the city's Parking Violations Bureau.

Amofah studied law in America and was involved in Ghana's politics, serving as a Deputy of Tourism under President Jerry Rawlings. In 2000, he had an argument with Rawlings over failing to choose Obed Asamoah as a running mate. Asamoah was rumored to have taken money from the National Democratic Congress (NDC) so that Amofah could have a position in the government. During the confrontation, Amofah allegedly slammed the door on Rawlings' fingers, injuring him. As a result, Amofah went into a self-imposed exile in the US, where he became a Magistrate Judge in Staten Island, New York. His membership in EGLE lapsed while he was out of the country shortly after. Amofah would later join the NDC in 2002 before leaving the party in 2008.

In 2013, he returned to Ghana as a member of the New Patriotic Party, where he supported his uncle Nana Akufo-Addo for a position in the government. However, when Akufo-Addo was running for president, he later changed his stance and claimed that Akufo-Addo would "be the worst President for Ghana." Amofah rejoined the NDC in 2014 and was supporting John Mahama's bid for presidency in the 2016 Ghanaian general election.

Children 
Amofah is the father of multiple children, including sons Randy and Desmond Amofah, who died in 2010 and 2019, respectively.

Randy died on 31 October 2010 from an asthma attack.

Desmond was an American YouTube personality and online streamer who was better known by his online alias "Etika". On 20 June 2019, Desmond was reported missing by the New York City Police Department, and his body was found in the East River on the evening of 24 June. After identification of his body, he was publicly pronounced dead on the morning of 25 June. On 26 June, the Office of Chief Medical Examiner determined that the cause of Desmond's death was drowning, and the manner was suicide.

Education 
He attended University of Ghana where he obtained his bachelor of laws degree before proceeding to Ghana Law school to become a barrister. He then relocated abroad to pursue his dreams and attended Brooklyn Law School before practicing Law in the country.

References

1956 births
Living people
20th-century Ghanaian lawyers
21st-century American judges
21st-century Ghanaian lawyers
21st-century Ghanaian politicians
Ghanaian emigrants to the United States
Ghanaian MPs 1993–1997
People from Eastern Region (Ghana)